Naberezhny (masculine), Naberezhnaya (feminine), or Naberezhnoye (neuter), Naberezhnye (plural)  may refer to:
Naberezhny, Republic of Adygea, a settlement in the Republic of Adygea, Russia
Naberezhny, name of several other rural localities in Russia
Naberezhnaya Tower, a skyscraper in Moscow, Russia
Naberezhnoye, name of several rural localities in Russia
Naberezhnye Chelny, a city in the Republic of Tatarstan, Russia